The LeapFrog Epic (styled as LeapFrog epic) is an Android-based mini-tablet computer produced and marketed by LeapFrog Enterprises. Released in 2015, the Epic is LeapFrog's first device to run on Android; most of LeapFrog's mobile computing devices for children run on a customized Ångström Linux distribution.

Name
Despite being sold alongside the LeapPad Explorer line of tablets, the device is not marketed as a LeapPad model and is instead referred to in official literature as the LeapFrog Epic, the latter moniker being a backronym for "explore, play, imagine and create", in reference to the Epic's educational nature.

Features

Hardware

The Epic has a  TFT-LCD touchscreen, Wi-Fi capability, a 1.3 GHz ARM Cortex-A7 MediaTek MT8127  processor, a 2.0 MP rear-facing camera and a 2.0 MP front-facing camera. As with other devices and toys marketed by the company, the Epic is aimed for children ages 3–9, and like the lower-end LeapPad Explorer line of tablets, edutainment games and applications made specifically for the device automatically adjust to account for the child's grade level. The Epic lacks a cartridge slot, thus making existing cartridge-based software for the LeapPad incompatible; a number of games for the LeapPad series were however ported to the tablet. The Epic also comes standard with a capacitive stylus, replacing the finger in situations where precision is needed, or in apps designed for use with the pen, and a silicone protective case for added shock resistance. The case, which comes in either lime green or pink, can be removed by the user, allowing access to the device's microSD slot.

An updated variant of the Epic called Academy Edition was released in 2017. It is essentially the same hardware as the original Epic, albeit with a redesigned silicone protective bumper and updated firmware with access to the LeapFrog Academy program. Another updated variant called the LeapPad Academy was released in 2019, which, like the Epic Academy Edition before it, came with access to the LeapFrog Academy program and a silicone bumper with a built-in kickstand.

Software
The Epic runs on the Android KitKat operating system, overlaid with LeapFrog's proprietary Kids Launcher UI with support for multiple user profiles and parental controls limiting the time a child can use the device along with content which can be accessed; an unrestricted parent mode is also available along with the stock Android web browser. The initial firmware release only came with support for applications and content purchased from LeapFrog's own App Center, though an update was later made available allowing apps bought or downloaded from the Amazon App Store to be installed.

By default the Epic does not come bundled with Google Play services installed, limiting app selection to the aforementioned App Center and Amazon App Store, along with APK packages sideloaded from outside sources; this can be worked around through rooting the device and copying Google Play components to the system partition, or flashing Google apps through a custom recovery such as TWRP.

While the Epic has not received a major operating system update since release, it can unofficially run Android 7.1.2 Nougat through a port of LineageOS 14.1 made by members of the xda-developers community.

Reception

Accolades
The Epic was released to mostly positive reception, earning awards from parenting and educational organizations for its design and features. The device also won the 2017 Award for Best Tablet from the children's media journal Kidscreen.

Critical reception
Peter Jenkinson of TrustedReviews gave the tablet four out of five stars, praising the form factor and user experience, but bemoaned the downloadable educational games' cost in comparison to apps available on mainstream content platforms. Laptop Mag'''s Henry T. Casey was less enthusiastic, criticizing the LCD screen quality, the device's weight and performance, stating "the waiting and sluggishness may try the patience of young children", but otherwise remarked the included software and battery life. Jim Martin of PC Advisor'' was similarly critical of Epic, criticizing the hardware and viewing the bundled software as having "limited educational value", instead recommending Amazon's Kids Edition Fire tablet.

See also
List of Android devices

References

External links

LeapFrog Epic Academy Edition

Android (operating system) devices
Tablet computers introduced in 2015
Tablet computers
2010s toys
Educational toys
Children's educational video games
Quanta Computer
Touchscreen portable media players